Roberto García Cabello (born 4 February 1980), known simply as Roberto, is a Spanish professional footballer who plays as a centre forward.

Club career
Born in Madrid, Roberto only made his debut in professional football in the 2008–09 season, aged 28, at the service of SD Huesca in Segunda División. In the previous campaign, he had scored a career-best 20 goals (plus two in the playoffs and one in the Copa del Rey) to help the club promote from Segunda División B for the first time ever.

Roberto played his first game in the second division of Spanish football on 31 August 2008, and scored in a 2–2 home draw against CD Castellón. He went on to amass second-tier totals of 141 matches and 32 goals, for Huesca and Gimnàstic de Tarragona.

In 2012, at the age of 32, Roberto moved abroad for the first time, going on to spend several years in the Cypriot First Division.

Club statistics

References

External links

1980 births
Living people
Footballers from Madrid
Spanish footballers
Association football forwards
Segunda División players
Segunda División B players
Tercera División players
Real Madrid Castilla footballers
AD Alcorcón footballers
Sevilla Atlético players
Mérida UD footballers
CD Guijuelo footballers
SD Huesca footballers
Burgos CF footballers
Gimnàstic de Tarragona footballers
CD Toledo players
CD Paracuellos Antamira players
CF Trival Valderas players
Cypriot First Division players
Apollon Limassol FC players
AC Omonia players
Spanish expatriate footballers
Expatriate footballers in Cyprus
Spanish expatriate sportspeople in Cyprus